The Digital Hub is a cluster of technology, digital media and internet companies in The Liberties area of Dublin, Ireland. The hub consists of almost 75 companies located in eight buildings, collectively employing 700 people. It is the largest enterprise cluster of its kind in Ireland.

History
The Irish Government founded The Digital Hub in 2003 to cater for companies involved in information technology, with Media Lab Europe—a business venture by MIT, as its anchor. By 2017, more than 200 companies have (or still are) located there, including Amazon, Etsy, Havok, Houghton Mifflin Harcourt, Lonely Planet, Eventbrite, Slack, and Stripe.

In 2016 Fiach Mac Conghail, former Director of the Abbey Theatre, was appointed CEO of the Digital Hub Development Agency, the state agency which operates and promotes The Digital Hub.

References

External links
 thedigitalhub.com

Places in Dublin (city)
Information technology places